Pettino (Pitinum in Latin) is a frazione of the comune of Campello sul Clitunno and former Latin Catholic bishopric in the Province of Perugia, in central Italy's  Umbria region.

It stands at an elevation of 1074 metres above sea level. At the time of the Istat census of 2001, it had only 74 inhabitants.

Ecclesiastical history 
The Diocese of Pitinum (or Pettino) was established circa 300 AD, but suppressed circa 400 AD and had its territory reassigned to the Diocese of Amiterno. No incumbents available.

References

Source and External links 
 GCatholic 

Frazioni of the Province of Perugia